Major General Lancelot Daryl Hickes  (30 May 1884 – 4 October 1965) was a senior British Army officer during the Second World War.

Biography
Born on 30 May 1884 at Hornsey to William Alexander Jardine Hickes & Emilie Louise Hickes (née Keller), Lancelot Hickes was educated at Bedford School and at the Royal Military Academy, Woolwich. He received his first commission as a second lieutenant in the Royal Garrison Artillery in 1903. Between 1908 and 1914 he embarked on the first of two tours with the Royal Garrison Artillery as part of the West African Frontier Force.

He served with distinction during the First World War, mentioned in dispatches four times, promoted to the rank of captain in 1914 and brevetted major in 1918, receiving the Military Cross. In 1919 he became an Officer of the Order of the British Empire, and, after attending the Staff College, Camberley from 1920 to 1921, returned to serve again with the West African Frontier Force from 1921 to 1925.

Between 1936 and 1937 he served as an instructor at Senior Officers' School and in 1938 became Assistant Director of the Territorial Army. At the outset of the Second World War he was promoted to the rank of major general, and served as General Officer Commanding, 3rd Anti-Aircraft Division between 1938 and 1939, responsible for Scotland's Anti-Aircraft defences.

Major General Lancelot Hickes was director of staff duties at the War Office between 1939 and 1941. He became a Commander of the Order of the Bath in 1941.

Lancelot Hickes retired from the British Army in 1942 and died on 4 October 1965, survived by his only child, Major Anthony Denis Hickes (10 July 1917 – 12 July 2012) from his first marriage to Vera Hickes (née Newbury).

References

https://www.britishmilitaryhistory.co.uk/docs-united-kingdom-1939-anti-aircraft-command-1939/

Bibliography

External links
Generals of World War II

1884 births
1965 deaths
British Army major generals
People educated at Bedford School
Graduates of the Royal Military Academy, Woolwich
Royal Garrison Artillery officers
Anti-Aircraft Command officers
British Army personnel of World War I
British Army generals of World War II
Recipients of the Military Cross
Companions of the Order of the Bath
Officers of the Order of the British Empire
Graduates of the Staff College, Camberley